Harold Steele may refer to:

Harold Steele (archdeacon), New Zealand archdeacon

See also
Harold Steel (1862–1911), English cricketer 
Harry Steele (disambiguation)